Long Range Patrol is a 2013 Finnish feature film directed by Harri J. Rantala and starring Eerik Kantokoski, Ali Ahovaara, Hannu Rantala, Kalevi Haapoja and Eeva Putro. The film was filmed in Seinäjoki, Kauhava and Nurmo located in South Ostrobothnia.

Plot
Long-Range Patrol is a story about the Squad Peltoniemi Patrol trip to the enemies backside in spring 1943.
The capturing of a Russian female soldier changes the whole task from a routine mission to a battle for survival.

Cast
 Eerik Kantokoski as Captain Erkki Peltoniemi
 Ali Ahovaara as Corporal Eero Ilkka
 Hannu Rantala as Private Tuomas Loukasmäki 
 Kalevi Haapoja as Colonel Juho Loukasmäki
 Eeva Putro as Russian female soldier 
 Reeta Annala as Enni Peltoniemi
 Kauko Salo as Sameli Peltoniemi
 Kristiina Karhu as Laura Peltoniemi
 Jaakko Seppä as Lieutenant Itäniemi

References

External links
 
 

Films directed by Harri J. Rantala
Finnish action adventure films
2010s Finnish-language films
2013 films
Finnish World War II films